The Rivoli is a bar, restaurant and performance space, established in 1982, on Queen Street West in Toronto, Ontario, Canada. 

The club originally earned a reputation as one of Canada's hippest music clubs, and many major Canadian comedy and musical performers have played on its stage, including The Kids in the Hall, Gordon Downie, The Frantics, Sean Cullen and the infamous Dark Shows.  The Drowsy Chaperone premiered at the Rivoli and went on to subsequent productions and eventually a highly successful run on Broadway.

History
Established and owned by Andre Rosenbaum, David Stearn, and Jeff Strasburg, in the 1980s, the Rivoli was synonymous with Toronto's black-garbed Queen West scene (Mike Myers' Saturday Night Live German club character Dieter was inspired by a Rivoli waiter). This reputation waned as the club's clientele became more eclectic and upscale, but the Rivoli's atmosphere is still unique. Talent scouts for Montreal's Just For Laughs comedy festival and the major television networks still routinely troll the Monday night comedy shows.

From 1987 to 1990 the Journal of Wild Culture held its regular avant-garde vaudeville nights, the Café of Wild Culture, featuring a mix of artists exploring the magazine's  ecology and imagination mandate. Since the 1990s the Rivoli has been home to The ALTdot COMedy Lounge, Toronto's most popular alternative comedy show.

In 2014, the original owners sold the business to Jenna Wood, Sarah Henning, and Jessica McHardy. Henning left the venture in early 2020; several months later amid the COVID-19 pandemic, remaining partners Wood and McHardy listed the business for sale for Can$500,000.

Venue Layout
The venue is divided into three main areas, the front, the upstairs and the back. The front of the venue has a bar along most of its west wall. The east side of the front room, separated from the bar by a dividing wall, are tables for dining. Upstairs there is a pool hall with 11 vintage and antique tables.  The space is large and sometimes dance nights or private parties are hosted there.  The back room of the venue contains a stage at the back. There is a smaller bar in the back room, and some bar seating along the side walls. The audience area is sometimes open for standing room, sometimes tables and chairs are set up, and sometimes chairs are set up in rows. Seating is rarely assigned or reserved. Patrons are typically free to eat or drink in the front room without paying for admission to shows. The Rivoli's menu is known for an eclectic and upscale motif.

References

External links
 Rivoli website
 Rivoli Facebook
 Rivoli Twitter
 Rivoli Instagram

Event venues established in 1982
Restaurants in Toronto
Music venues in Toronto
Nightclubs in Toronto
1982 establishments in Ontario